In Buddhism, the bodhipakkhiyā dhammā (Pali; variant spellings include bodhipakkhikā dhammā and bodhapakkhiyā dhammā; Skt.: bodhipaka dharma) are qualities (dhammā) conducive or related to (pakkhiya) awakening/understanding (bodhi), i.e. the factors and wholesome qualities which are developed when the mind is trained (bhavana). 

In the Pali commentaries, the term bodhipakkhiyā dhammā is used to refer to seven sets of such qualities regularly attributed to the Buddha throughout the Pali Canon.  Within these seven sets of bodhi-related qualities, there is listed a total of thirty-seven repetitious and interrelated qualities (sattatisa bodhipakkhiyā dhammā).

These seven sets of qualities are recognized by both Theravadan and Mahayanan Buddhists as complementary facets of the Buddhist path to bodhi.

Seven sets of thirty-seven qualities 
In the Pali Canon's Bhāvanānuyutta sutta ("Mental Development Discourse," AN 7.67), the Buddha is recorded as saying:

Elsewhere in the Canon, and in numerous places in the āgamas of other early schools, these seven sets of thirty-seven qualities conducive to Enlightenment are enumerated as:

Four establishments/presences of mindfulness (cattāro satipaṭṭhānā)

 Mindfulness of the body (kāyānupassanā, S. kayānupasthāna)
 Mindfulness of feelings (vedanānupassanā, S. vedanānupasthāna)
 Mindfulness of mental states (cittānupassanā, S. cittanupasthāna)
 Mindfulness of mental qualities (dhammānupassanā, S. dharmanupasthāna)

Four right exertions/efforts/strivings (cattāro sammappadhānā) 

 Effort for the preventing of unskillful states to arise
 Effort for the abandoning of the already arisen unskillful states
 Effort for the arising of skillful states
 Effort for the sustaining and increasing of arisen skillful states

Four bases of spiritual power (cattāro iddhipādā)

 Intention or will (chanda, S. chanda)
 Effort (viriya, S. vīrya)
 Consciousness (citta, S. citta)

Five spiritual faculties (pañca indriya)

 Conviction (saddhā, S. śraddhā)
 Effort (viriya, s. vīrya)
 Mindfulness (sati, S. smṛti)
 Concentration/Unification (samādhi, S. samādhi)
 Wisdom (paññā, S. prajñā)

Five Strengths (pañca bala)

 Conviction (saddhā, S. śraddhā)
 Effort (viriya, S. vīrya)
 Mindfulness (sati, S. smṛti)
 Concentration/Unification (samādhi, S. samādhi)
 Wisdom (paññā, S. prajñā)

Seven Factors of bodhi (awakening, understanding)

 Mindfulness (sati, S. smṛti)
 Investigation (dhamma vicaya, S. dharmapravicaya)
 Effort (viriya, S. vīrya)
 Joy (pīti, S. prīti)
 Tranquillity (passaddhi, S. praśrabdhi)
 Concentration/Unification (samādhi, S. samādhi)
 Equanimity (upekkhā, S. upekṣā)

Noble Eightfold Path 

 Right Understanding (sammā diṭṭhi, S. samyag-dṛṣṭi)
 Right Intention (sammā saṅkappa, S. samyak-saṃkalpa)
 Right Speech (sammā vācā, S. samyag-vāc)
 Right Action (sammā kammanta, S. samyak-karmānta)
 Right Livelihood (sammā ājīva, S. samyag-ājīva)
 Right Effort/Energy (sammā vāyāma, S. samyag-vyāyāma)
 Right Mindfulness (sammā sati, S. samyak-smṛti)
 Right Concentration/Unification (sammā samādhi, S. samyak-samādhi)

Forty-one and forty-three qualities 
A sutta found in The Senior Collection of Gandhāran Buddhist texts ascribes forty one instead of thirty seven beneficial dharmas. The Gandharan text includes rūpajhānas which the Pali tradition does not. Salomon notes this forty one numbered list appears in both a Chinese translation of the Dirghagama which current scholarship believes to be of the Dharmaguptaka school of Buddhism and a Chinese translation of the Dharmaguptaka vinaya.

In the Pali Canon's Nettipakaraṇa  (Netti 112) forty-three qualities connected with awakening (tecattālīsa bodhipakkhiyā dhammā) are mentioned which, according to the commentaries, include the aforementioned thirty-seven plus the following 6 contemplations (also found in the suttas, e.g. Saṅgīti Sutta D iii 251)
 The contemplation of the three marks of existence:
 impermanence
 suffering (dukkhasaññā)
 non-self (anattasaññā)
 abandoning
 dispassion
 cessation

In the Pali literature 
The technical term, bodhipakkhiyā dhammā, explicitly referring to the seven sets of qualities identified above, is first encountered in the Pali commentaries; nonetheless, the seven sets of bodhipakkhiya dhammas are themselves first collated, enumerated and referenced in the Sutta Pitaka and Abhidhamma Pitaka.

Sutta Pitaka 
In the Digha Nikāya's famed Maha-parinibbana Sutta (DN 16), which recounts the Buddha's last days, in the Buddha's last address to his assembly of followers he states:
"Now, O bhikkhus, I say to you that these teachings of which I have direct knowledge and which I have made known to you — these you should thoroughly learn, cultivate, develop, and frequently practice, that the life of purity may be established and may long endure, for the welfare and happiness of the multitude, out of compassion for the world, for the benefit, well being, and happiness of gods and men.
"And what, bhikkhus, are these teachings? They are the four foundations of mindfulness, the four right efforts, the four constituents of psychic power, the five faculties, the five powers, the seven factors of enlightenment, and the Noble Eightfold Path. These, bhikkhus, are the teachings of which I have direct knowledge, which I have made known to you, and which you should thoroughly learn, cultivate, develop, and frequently practice...."

In the Majjhima Nikāya's "Greater Discourse to Sakuludāyin" (MN 77), when asked why his disciples venerated him, the Buddha identified five qualities he possessed: highest virtues (adhisīle ... paramena sīlakkhandha); highest knowledge and vision; highest wisdom; his explanation of the Four Noble Truths (ariyasaccāni); and, his identification of numerous ways to develop wholesome states.
The Buddha's elaboration of the last item included the seven sets of thirty-seven bodhipakkhiya dhammas which are enumerated individually in this discourse. 

In the Samyutta Nikaya, the fifth division's first seven chapters are each devoted to one of the bodhipakkhiya dhammas. While there is a great deal of repetition among these chapters' discourses, these seven chapters include almost 900 discourses.

In the Anguttara Nikaya's "" (AN 5.6.6), the Buddha recommends five things for a monk to overcome spiritual hindrances: control mental faculties; eat the right amount of food; maintain wakefulness; be aware of merit; and, develop the bodhipakkhiya dhammas throughout the day.

In the Khuddaka Nikāya, the bodhipakkhiya dhammas are mentioned at Iti. 82, Th. 900, and Nett. 31, 112, 197, 237, 240 and 261.

Abhidhamma Pitaka 
The bodhipakkhiyā dhammā are mentioned in several passages of the Abhidhamma, such as at Vbh. sections 571 and 584 .

Commentaries 
In the Visuddhimagga, Buddhaghosa enumerates the seven sets of bodhipakkhiya dhammas along with a relevant Sutta Pitaka discourse (Vism. XXII.33), describes each set (Vism. XXII.34-38), and describes their existence in the consciousness of an arahant (Vism. XXII.39-40).  In addition, Buddhaghosa factors the 37 qualities in a manner so as to describe fourteen non-redundant qualities (Vism. XXII.40-43); thus, for instance, while nine qualities (zeal, consciousness, joy, tranquility, equanimity, intention, speech, action, livelihood) are mentioned only once in the full list of 37 qualities, the other five qualities are mentioned multiple times.  Table 1 below identifies the five qualities spanning multiple bodhipakkhiya-dhamma sets.

In terms of other Pali commentaries, the bodhipakkhiyā dhammā are also mentioned in Dhammapada-Aṭṭhakathā (DhA i.230), Suttanipāta-Aṭṭhakathā (SnA 164), and Jātaka-Aṭṭhakathā (J i.275, iii.290, and v.483).

See also 
 Basic Points Unifying the Theravada and the Mahayana
 Bojjhanga
 Five Strengths
 Four Noble Truths
 Four Right Exertions
 Index of Buddhism-related articles
 Satipatthana
 Secular Buddhism
 Three marks of existence
 Threefold Training

Notes

References

Sources 

 
 Buddhaghosa, Bhadantacariya & Bhikkhu  (trans.) (1999). The Path of Purification: Visuddhimagga. Seattle, WA: BPS Pariyatti Editions. .
  (Cited in Bodhi, 2000, p. 1937 n. 235.)
 
 
 
 
  Cited on http://www.serve.com/cmtan/buddhism/Misc/unify.html ; retrieved on 2007-05-22 .
  A general on-line search engine for the PED is available at http://dsal.uchicago.edu/dictionaries/pali/.
 Sri Lanka Tripitaka Project (SLTP) (n.d.-a).  (Vbh. ch. 12, in Pali). Retrieved on 2007-05-24 from "METTANET - LANKA" at: https://web.archive.org/web/20060109215754/http://www.metta.lk/tipitaka/3Abhidhamma-Pitaka/2-Vibhanga/12-jhanavibhanga-p.htm.
 Sri Lanka Tripitaka Project (SLTP) (n.d.-b).  (MN 77, in Pali). Retrieved on 2007-05-22 from "METTANET - LANKA" at: https://web.archive.org/web/20160322070126/http://metta.lk/tipitaka/2Sutta-Pitaka/2Majjhima-Nikaya/Majjhima2/077-mahasakuludayi-p.html.
 Sri Lanka Tripitaka Project (SLTP) (n.d.-c). Vīsati-nipāto (Th ch. 20, gathas 705-948, in Pali). Retrieved on 2007-05-24 from "METTANET - LANKA" at: http://metta.lk/tipitaka/2Sutta-Pitaka/5Khuddaka-Nikaya/08Theragatha/20-Satti-nipatha-p.html.

Further reading
 
 Ledi Sayadaw (1904) The Requisites of Enlightenment; BPS Pariyatti Editions, 2013, ISBN 978-1681723419

External links 
 Buddhist Encyclopedia (n.d.). Seven Sets. 
 Wings to Awakening: An Anthology from the Pali Canon.  by Thanissaro Bhikkhu

Buddhist philosophical concepts